Kolodny is a surname. Notable people with the surname include:

Annette Kolodny (1941–2019), American literary critic and activist
Avinoam Kolodny, Israeli professor
Daniella Kolodny, Israeli rabbi
Debra Kolodny, American activist
Moshe Kol (1911–1989), Israeli politician and activist, born Moshe Kolodny
Robert C. Kolodny, American author

Fictional characters 
Corporal Kolodny, a character in Catch-22
Rose Kolodny, a character in the writings of William Gibson
The Kolodny Brothers, characters mentioned (not seen) in the film The Adventures of Buckaroo Bonzai

See also
 
 Kholodny (disambiguation)